The Amazing Quest of Mr. Ernest Bliss is a 1920 British silent comedy film directed by and starring Henry Edwards. As of August 2010, the film is listed as one of the British Film Institute's "75 Most Wanted" lost films. The film was remade in 1936 starring Cary Grant.

Cast
 Henry Edwards as Ernest Bliss
 Chrissie White as Frances Clayton
 Gerald Ames as Dorrington
 Mary Dibley as Kate Brent
 Reginald Bach as Jack Brent
 Henry Vibart as Sir James Alroyd
 Douglas Munro as John Masters
 Mary Brough as Gloria Mott
 John Turnbull as Willie Mott (as Stanley Turnbull)
 Gerard Hillier as Dick Honerton
 Gerald Annand as Crawley
 Esme Hubbard as Mrs. Heath
 James McWilliams as Clowes
 Ernest Milton as Mr. Montague
 John R. Allan as Sam Brownley

See also
 List of lost films

References

External links

1920 films
1920 comedy films
1920 lost films
British silent feature films
Lost British films
British black-and-white films
Films directed by Henry Edwards
Films based on works by E. Phillips Oppenheim
British comedy films
Hepworth Pictures films
Lost comedy films
1920s British films
Silent comedy films